Winogradskyella algicola is a bacterium from the genus of Winogradskyella which occur in the alga Dunaliella tertiolecta.

References

Flavobacteria
Bacteria described in 2020